Q&A is an interview series on the C-SPAN network that typically airs every Sunday night. It is typically hosted by C-SPAN President and co-CEO Susan Swain. Its stated purpose is to feature discussions with "interesting people who are making things happen in politics, the media, education, and science & technology in hour-long conversations about their lives and their work."

References

External links

2020
QandA
2020-related lists